Sankaranyeswarar Temple (சங்காரண்யேஸ்வரர் கோயில்) is a Hindu temple located in the village of Thalaichangadu in the Tharangambadi taluk of Mayiladuthurai district in Tamil Nadu, India.

Significance 

The presiding deity is Shiva as Somaskandar and the consort is Soundara Nayaki. The temple has been praised by Sambandar in the Thevaram. The temple is believed to have been initially constructed by the Chola king Kocengannan and renovated in the following centuries. Vishnu is believed to have worshipped Shiva at this place.

Shrines 
The temple is conch-shaped and there are shrines to Brahma, Vishnu and Ambal.

References

External links 
 

Shiva temples in Mayiladuthurai district
Padal Petra Stalam
Maadakkoil